Géiner Segura Mora  (born 14 October 1974) is a retired Costa Rican professional football player. He is currently a coach.

Club career
Segura made his Primera Division debut for Municipal Pérez Zeledón on 9 February 1994 then played for Cartagines before returning to play 10 seasons for Municipal Pérez Zeledón. In 2007, he decided to call it a day at Pérez Zeledón and signed for Santos de Guápiles only to leave them a few months later for Brujas. After playing a year for Universidad he had a season at second division Águilas Guanacastecas. He joined San Carlos ahead of the 2010 Verano season.

Retirement
In a 19-season career, Segura has appeared in 529 Costa Rican league matches, he retired in November 2012. He has made the third-most all-time league appearances for Pérez Zeledón with 365 league matches.

International career
The midfielder made his debut for the Ticos in 1995 against the USA and played in the Korea Cup that year, but was left out for 10 years to be recalled for a friendly international against Haïti in 2005. He then also played at the UNCAF Nations Cup 2005 and the 2005 CONCACAF Gold Cup.

He collected a total of 13 caps, scoring 1 goal.

Career statistics

International goals
Scores and results list. Costa Rica's goal tally first.

Personal life
Segura is married to Vanessa Jorge and they have three children.

References

External links
 Profile - Brujas FC club website
 

1974 births
Living people
Association football midfielders
Costa Rican footballers
Costa Rica international footballers
2005 UNCAF Nations Cup players
2005 CONCACAF Gold Cup players
Copa Centroamericana-winning players
Municipal Pérez Zeledón footballers
C.S. Cartaginés players
Santos de Guápiles footballers
Brujas FC players
Municipal Liberia footballers
C.F. Universidad de Costa Rica footballers
A.D. San Carlos footballers